Leptodactylus notoaktites is a species of frog in the family Leptodactylidae. It is endemic to southeastern Brazil and is known from the states of Santa Catarina, Paraná, and São Paulo state. Common name Iporanga white-lipped frog has been coined for it.

Etymology
The specific name notoaktites is derived from Greek notos (=south) and aktites (=coast dweller) and refers to the distribution of this species within Brazil.

Description
Adult males measure  and adult females  in snout–vent length. Males have a weakly spatulate snout. The tympanum is distinct. The toes lack fringes and fleshy ridges. The dorsolateral folds are distinct, whereas the lateral folds are interrupted. The dorsum is brown with a spotted, blotched, or striped pattern. Light mid-dorsal stripes are rarely present. The upper lip has usually a light stripe.

Habitat and conservation
Males of this species start calling at the onset of the very first rains. Breeding occurs prior to the flooding. Males excavate small burrows in shallow temporary pools, and the eggs are laid in foam nests.

Leptodactylus notoaktites  is a common species. It is threatened by habitat loss caused by agricultural encroachment and infrastructure development. However, its range overlaps with several protected areas.

References

notoaktites
Endemic fauna of Brazil
Amphibians of Brazil
Amphibians described in 1978
Taxonomy articles created by Polbot